Brian J. Preston FRSN SC (born June 10, 1958) is the Chief Judge of the Land and Environment Court of New South Wales. He was appointed on 14 November 2005.

Career
Preston graduated from Macquarie University in 1982. He practised as a solicitor from 1982 to 1987, and as a barrister from 1987 to 2005.

He began his career at Stephen Jaques & Stephen, in the firm's resources group, then became associate to Mr Justice O’Leary of the Supreme Court of the Northern Territory.

Preston was Principal Solicitor at the NSW Environmental Defender's Office from March 1985, overseeing its official opening in May that year.

Appointed a Senior Counsel (SC) by the NSW Bar Association in 1999.

He received in 2010 an award from the Asian Environmental Compliance and Enforcement Network (AECEN) for his environmental work.

In February 2018 the then Governor of New South Wales, General David Hurley AC DSC(Rtd) promulgated the election of Brian Preston as a Fellow of the Royal Society of NSW (FRSN - Est 1821, Act of Parliament 1888 for the advancement of Science, Philosophy, Literature and the Arts) in the NSW Government Gazette.

References 

 

 

People educated at Knox Grammar School
1958 births
Living people
20th-century Australian judges